This is a selected list of notable artists from, or with links to, Guernsey.

Peter Monamy (1681–1749), English marine painter
Paul Jacob Naftel (1817–1891), artist
Douglas Cowper (1817–1839), painter
Denys Corbet (1826–1909), poet and painter
Mary Eily de Putron (1914–1982), Irish and Guernsey stained glass artist and archaeologist
Frederick Moynihan (1843–1910), sculptor
Peter Le Vasseur (born 1938), artist
Chris Foss (born 1946), British artist and science fiction illustrator

Lists of artists by nationality
Artists